The 2017–18 High Point Panthers men's basketball team represented High Point University during the 2017–18 NCAA Division I men's basketball season. The Panthers, led by ninth-year head coach Scott Cherry, played their home games at the Millis Athletic Convocation Center as members of the Big South Conference. They finished the season 14–16, 9–9 in Big South play to finish in a four-way tie for fifth place. As a 7 seed, they lost to Longwood in the first round of the Big South tournament.

On March 7, 2018, head coach Scott Cherry and the school mutually agreed to part ways. On March 26, it was reported that the school had hired High Point alumnus Tubby Smith as head coach.

Previous season
The Panthers finished the season 15–16, 9–9 in Big South play to finish in fifth place. They lost in the quarterfinals of the Big South tournament to Gardner–Webb.

Roster

Schedule and results 

|-
!colspan=12 style=| Exhibition

|-
!colspan=12 style=| Non-conference regular season

|-
!colspan=12 style=| Big South regular season

|-
!colspan=12 style=| Big South tournament

References

High Point Panthers men's basketball seasons
High Point